Vowinckel is a census-designated place in Farmington Township, Clarion County, in the U.S. state of Pennsylvania. The community is located along Pennsylvania Route 66 in far northeastern Clarion County. As of the 2010 census the population was 139.

References

External links

Census-designated places in Clarion County, Pennsylvania
Census-designated places in Pennsylvania